Nina Shipperlee (born 1936) is a female former Welsh international lawn bowler.

Bowls career
Shipperlee won the triples silver medal at the 1997 Atlantic Bowls Championships in Llandrindod Wells.

Five years later, she won the bronze medal in the fours with Gill Miles, Ann Sutherland and Pam John at the 2002 Commonwealth Games in Manchester.

Shipperlee won the National pairs title in 1998 and 1999.

She still bowls for the Whitchurch Bowling Club in North Cardiff and in 1988 became the clubs first member to be capped by Wales.

References

Living people
1936 births
Bowls players at the 2002 Commonwealth Games
Commonwealth Games medallists in lawn bowls
Welsh female bowls players
Commonwealth Games bronze medallists for Wales
Medallists at the 2002 Commonwealth Games